15th Online Film Critics Society Awards
January 2, 2012

Best Picture: 
 The Tree of Life 
The 15th Online Film Critics Society Awards, honoring the best in film for 2011, were announced on 2 January 2012.

Winners and nominees

Best Picture
The Tree of Life
The Artist
The Descendants
Drive
Hugo

Best Director
Terrence Malick – The Tree of Life
Michel Hazanavicius – The Artist
Martin Scorsese – Hugo
Lars von Trier – Melancholia
Nicolas Winding Refn – Drive

Best Actor
Michael Fassbender – Shame
George Clooney – The Descendants
Jean Dujardin – The Artist
Gary Oldman – Tinker Tailor Soldier Spy
Michael Shannon – Take Shelter

Best Actress
Tilda Swinton – We Need to Talk About Kevin
Kirsten Dunst – Melancholia
Elizabeth Olsen – Martha Marcy May Marlene
Meryl Streep – The Iron Lady
Michelle Williams – My Week with Marilyn

Best Supporting Actor
Christopher Plummer – Beginners
Albert Brooks – Drive
John Hawkes – Martha Marcy May Marlene
Nick Nolte – Warrior
Brad Pitt – The Tree of Life

Best Supporting Actress
Jessica Chastain – The Tree of Life
Melissa McCarthy – Bridesmaids
Janet McTeer – Albert Nobbs
Carey Mulligan – Shame
Shailene Woodley – The Descendants

Best Original Screenplay
Midnight in Paris – Woody AllenMartha Marcy May Marlene – Sean Durkin
A Separation – Asghar Farhadi
The Tree of Life – Terrence Malick
Win Win – Tom McCarthy

Best Adapted ScreenplayTinker Tailor Soldier Spy – Bridget O'Connor & Peter StraughanThe Descendants – Nat Faxon, Jim Rash & Alexander Payne
Drive – Hossein Amini
Moneyball – Steven Zaillian & Aaron Sorkin
We Need to Talk About Kevin – Lynne Ramsay & Rory Stewart Kinnear

Best Foreign Language FilmA Separation
13 Assassins
Certified Copy
The Skin I Live In
Uncle Boonmee Who Can Recall His Past Lives

Best Documentary
Cave of Forgotten Dreams
The Interrupters
Into the Abyss
Project Nim
Tabloid

Best Animated Feature
Rango
The Adventures of Tintin: The Secret of the Unicorn
Arthur Christmas
Kung Fu Panda 2
Winnie the Pooh

Best Cinematography
The Tree of Life – Emmanuel Lubezki
The Artist – Guillaume Schiffman
Drive – Newton Thomas Sigel
Hugo – Robert Richardson
Melancholia – Manuel Alberto Claro

Best Editing
The Tree of Life – Hank Corwin, Jay Rabinowitz, Daniel Rezende, Billy Weber & Mark Yoshikawa
Drive – Matthew Newman
Martha Marcy May Marlene – Zachary Stuart-Pontier
Tinker Tailor Soldier Spy – Dino Jonsäter
We Need to Talk About Kevin – Joe Bini

Special Awards
To Jessica Chastain, the breakout performer of the year
To Martin Scorsese in honor of his work and dedication to the pursuit of film preservation

References 
'The Tree of Life' Leads Online Film Critics Society Award Nominations indieWire
15th Annual Online Film Critics Society Awards AwardsDaily

2011 film awards
2011